Neofriseria mongolinella is a moth of the family Gelechiidae. It is found in Russia (the southern Ural and Siberia: Tuva) and Mongolia.

Taxonomy
It was formerly treated as a subspecies of Neofriseria sceptrophora.

References

Moths described in 1987
Neofriseria